Zbigniew Andrzej Skrudlik (born 12 May 1934) is a Polish fencer. He won a silver medal in the team foil event at the 1964 Summer Olympics and a bronze in the same event at the 1968 Summer Olympics.

References

1934 births
Living people
Polish male fencers
Olympic fencers of Poland
Fencers at the 1964 Summer Olympics
Fencers at the 1968 Summer Olympics
Olympic silver medalists for Poland
Olympic bronze medalists for Poland
Olympic medalists in fencing
People from Jasło
Medalists at the 1964 Summer Olympics
Medalists at the 1968 Summer Olympics
Sportspeople from Podkarpackie Voivodeship
Universiade medalists in fencing
Universiade silver medalists for Poland
Medalists at the 1963 Summer Universiade
21st-century Polish people
20th-century Polish people